Spanish; Himno de Valledupar

Hymn of Valledupar, is the representative anthem of Valledupar, a city located in northern Colombia. Established since 1984 by then Mayor of Valledupar, Miguel Meza Valera, the anthem was selected from a public contest and won by Samarian composer Rita Feranandez Padilla and musician Carlos Julio Parra, selected by a jury formed by Consuelo Araujo Noguera, Simon Martinez Ubarnez and Luis Rosenzwelg.

The anthem was selected after an open contest to the public ordered by Mayor's decree 16.

Lyrics

 

Anthems of Colombian cities
Spanish-language songs
Valledupar